Audiovisión is the third studio album of the Chilean singer-songwriter Gepe. It was released on September 7, 2010, both in CD and vinyl. This album was nominated in the Premios Altazor for Best Artist Pop.

Track listing

References 

2010 albums
Gepe albums